Macpherson Stadium may refer to one of the following:

Macpherson Stadium, Hong Kong
Macpherson Stadium (North Carolina)